Sukhram Rathva is an Indian National Congress politician from the state of Gujarat, India. He was a member of Gujarat Legislative Assembly from Jetpur, Chhota Udaipur constituency.

Sukhram Rathva was elected as Leader of Opposition in Gujarat Legislative Assembly on 3 December 2021.

References 

Indian National Congress politicians from Gujarat
Living people
Gujarat MLAs 2017–2022
Year of birth missing (living people)